The following lists the dalvoys and Diwans of the Kingdom of Mysore from the 18th century to the 20th.

See also
 List of chief ministers of Karnataka
 Prime Minister of Hyderabad
 List of Diwans of Travancore

References

External links
 Mysore, Princely States of India, WorldStatesmen.org

Kingdom of Mysore
 
Diwans of Mysore
Diwans of Mysore
Mysore
People of the Kingdom of Mysore